The Perfect Age of Rock 'n' Roll is a music-themed drama film starring Kevin Zegers and Jason Ritter and directed by Scott Rosenbaum. The screenplay was written by Scott Rosenbaum and Jasin Cadic. The film was released on-demand & in limited theatrical release on August 5, 2011.

Plot
According to rock and roll lore, age twenty-seven is a fateful milestone laced with tragic deaths, the 27 Club including Jimi Hendrix, Janis Joplin, Jim Morrison, and Brian Jones, all shooting stars who were felled in their prime by drugs and fame. In this film, childhood friends come face to face with the demons of rock and roll (lust, drugs, and passion) on a cross-country road trip that compels them to face their past, present, and future. Rocker Spyder (Kevin Zegers), whose debut album was a huge hit saw his follow-on album bomb, causing him to retreat to his small hometown and give up. Seven years later, 27-year-old Spyder reconnects with his long-lost best friend and writer of his debut album Eric (Jason Ritter), son of a late great punk rock guitar legend, who has long settled into the sedate life of a suburban middle school music teacher. The reunion forces the two to recall their youthful ambitions and re-examine the choices they've made.

Cast
Kevin Zegers as Spyder
Jason Ritter as Eric Genson
Peter Fonda as August West
Taryn Manning as Rose Atropos
Lauren Holly as Liza Genson 
Aimee Teegarden as Annie Genson
James Ransone as Chip Genson
Lukas Haas as Clifton Hanger

The film also featured appearances by rocker Billy Morrison and blues musicians Pinetop Perkins, Hubert Sumlin Willie "Big Eyes" Smith, Bob Stroger and Sugar Blue.

Production
Production took place in New Jersey, New York City and Los Angeles.

Reception
Rotten Tomatoes reported that none of the 14 critics who reviewed this film gave it a positive review, with an average rating of 2.7/10.

References

External links
 
 Official website

2009 films
2009 drama films
American independent films
Films shot in Los Angeles
Films shot in New York (state)
Films shot in New Jersey
2000s English-language films
2000s American films